

Plants

Angiosperms

Arthropods

Insects

Archosauromorpha

Newly named dinosaurs
Data courtesy of George Olshevsky's dinosaur genera list.

Newly named plesiosaurs

Synapsids

Non-mammalian

References

1920s in paleontology
Paleontology
Paleontology 5